The 2018 Venezuelan protest movement is mass protests and a wave of demonstrations and unprecedented marches against low MDs salary and unions protests against hyperinflation in Venezuela, starting in May 2018, and ending in August 2018, with none of their main focal points made with the government.

Lawyers, jobless workers and teachers also held strikes throughout the strike movement period. Large confrontations occur during the protests, but the nonviolent movement continues, calling for salaries and better wage increases. President Nicolás Maduro condemned the protest actions. 

Protesters formed cacerolazo, human chains, barricades, roadblocks and pickets nationwide. After the protests, the large demonstrations turned smaller and dwindled after police violence in July, in which tens were injured and hundreds were arrested.

See also
 2020 Venezuelan protests

References

2018 in Venezuela
Protests in Venezuela
2018 protests